A list of films produced in Egypt in 1952. For an A-Z list of films currently on Wikipedia, see :Category:Egyptian films.

External links
 Egyptian films of 1952 at the Internet Movie Database
 Egyptian films of 1952 elCinema.com

Lists of Egyptian films by year
1952 in Egypt
Lists of 1952 films by country or language